The first cabinet of Tunisian Head of Government Hamadi Jebali was presented on 20 December 2011. Jebali has been appointed by interim President Moncef Marzouki, who had been elected by the National Constituent Assembly, a body constituted to draft a new constitution after the Tunisian Revolution and the fall of former President Zine El Abidine Ben Ali in Spring 2011. It took office on 24 December 2011. The three parties in the "Troika" coalition are the Islamist Ennahda Movement, the centre-left secularist Congress for the Republic (CPR), and the social democratic Democratic Forum for Labour and Liberties (Ettakatol).

Cabinet members 

The Jebali government consisted of the Prime Minister, four deputy prime ministers, 30 ministers and 11 state secretaries.

References

External links
Composition of the Provisional Government, Government of Tunisia

Tunisia, Cabinet
Cabinets established in 2011
2011 establishments in Tunisia
Cabinets disestablished in 2013
2013 disestablishments in Tunisia
2011 in Tunisian politics
2012 in Tunisian politics
2013 in Tunisian politics